Jan Brueghel (also Bruegel or Breughel) the Elder (1568 – 13 January 1625) was a Flemish painter and draughtsman. He was the son of the eminent Flemish Renaissance painter Pieter Bruegel the Elder. A close friend and frequent collaborator with Peter Paul Rubens, the two artists were the leading Flemish painters in the first three decades of the 17th century.

Brueghel worked in many genres including history paintings, flower still lifes, allegorical and mythological scenes, landscapes and seascapes, hunting pieces, village scenes, battle scenes and scenes of hellfire and the underworld. He was an important innovator who invented new types of paintings such as flower garland paintings, paradise landscapes, and gallery paintings in the first quarter of the 17th century. He further created genre paintings that were imitations, pastiches and reworkings of his father's works, in particular his father's genre scenes and landscapes with peasants. Brueghel represented the type of the pictor doctus, the erudite painter whose works are informed by the religious motifs and aspirations of the Catholic Counter-Reformation as well as the scientific revolution with its interest in accurate description and classification. He was court painter of the Archduke and Duchess Albrecht and Isabella, the governors of the Habsburg Netherlands.

The artist was nicknamed "Velvet" Brueghel, "Flower" Brueghel, and "Paradise" Brueghel. The first is believed to have been given him because of his mastery in the rendering of fabrics. The second nickname is a reference to his fame as a painter of (although not a specialist in) flower pieces and the last one to his invention of the genre of the paradise landscape. His brother Pieter Brueghel the Younger was traditionally nicknamed "de helse Brueghel" or "Hell Brueghel" because it was believed he was the author of a number of paintings with fantastic depictions of fire and grotesque imagery. These paintings have now been reattributed to Jan Brueghel the Elder.

Life

Jan Brueghel the Elder was born in Brussels as the son of Pieter Bruegel the Elder and Maria (called 'Mayken') Coecke van Aelst. His mother was the daughter of the prominent Flemish Renaissance artists Pieter Coecke van Aelst and Mayken Verhulst. His father died about a year after Jan's birth in 1569. It is believed that after the death of his mother in 1578, Jan, together with his brother Pieter Brueghel the Younger and sister Marie, went to live with their grandmother Mayken Verhulst, who was by then widowed. Mayken Verhulst was an artist in her own right. The early Flemish biographer Karel van Mander wrote in his Schilder-boeck published in 1604 that Mayken was the first art teacher of her two grandsons. She taught them drawing and watercolor painting of miniatures. Jan and his brother may also have trained with local artists in Brussels who were active as tapestry designers.

Jan and his brother Pieter were then sent to Antwerp to study oil painting. According to Karel van Mander he studied under Peter Goetkint, an important dealer with a large collection of paintings in his shop. Goetkint died on 15 July 1583 not very long after Jan had started his training. It is possible that Jan continued his studies in this shop, which was taken over by Goetkint's widow, as no other master is recorded.

It was common for Flemish painters of that time to travel to Italy to complete their studies. Jan Brueghel left for Italy, first traveling to Cologne where his sister Marie and her family lived. He later visited Frankenthal, an important cultural centre where a number of Flemish landscape artists were active. He then went to Naples after probably spending time in Venice. In Naples he produced after June 1590 a number of drawings, which show his interest in landscapes and monumental architecture. He worked for Don Francesco Caracciolo, a prominent nobleman and priest and founder of the Clerics Regular Minor. Jan produced small-scale decorative works for Don Francesco. 

Brueghel left Naples for Rome where he resided from 1592 to 1594. He befriended Paul Bril. Paul Bril was a landscape specialist from Antwerp who had moved to Rome in the late 16th century. Together with his brother Mathijs Bril, he created atmospheric landscapes for many Roman residences. Brueghel took inspiration from Bril's lively drawings and small-scale landscapes of the mid-1590s. During his time in Rome Jan Brueghel became acquainted with Hans Rottenhammer, a German painter of small highly finished cabinet paintings on copper. Rottenhammer painted religious and mythological compositions, combining German and Italian elements of style, which were highly esteemed. Brueghel collaborated with both Paul Bril and Rottenhammer. Brueghel also spent time making watercolors of Rome's antique monuments and seemed particularly fascinated by the vaulted interiors of the Colosseum.

He enjoyed the protection of Cardinal Ascanio Colonna. In Rome he also met Cardinal Federico Borromeo, who played an important role in the Counter-Reformation and was also an avid art collector. The Cardinal became Brueghel's lifelong friend and patron. Brueghel took up residence in Borromeo's Palazzo Vercelli. When Borromeo became archbishop of Milan in June 1595, Brueghel followed him and became part of the Cardinal's household. He produced many landscape and flower paintings for the Cardinal.

Brueghel stayed about a year in Milan and in 1596 he had returned to Antwerp where he remained active, save for a few interruptions, for the rest of his life. A year after his return Jan Brueghel was admitted as a Free Master in Antwerp's Guild of Saint Luke as the son of a master. The artist married on 23 January 1599 in the Cathedral of Our Lady in Antwerp. The bride was Isabella de Jode, the daughter of the cartographer, engraver and publisher Gerard de Jode. Their son Jan was born on 13 September 1601. This first-born had Rubens as his godfather and later took over his father's workshop and was known as Jan Brueghel the Younger.

Brueghel was registered as a burgher of Antwerp on 4 October 1601 as 'Jan Bruegel, Peetersone, schilder, van Bruessele' ('Jan Bruegel, son of Peeter, painter, of Brussels'). Just a month before, Brueghel had been elected dean of the Guild of Saint Luke, but he had not been able to take up the position as he was not a burgher of Antwerp. Upon becoming formally registered as a burgher the same year Brueghel could finally be the dean. The next year he was re-elected as dean.

In 1603 his daughter Paschasia Brueghel was born. Rubens was also her godfather. His wife Isabella de Jode died the same year leaving him with two young children. It has been speculated that death of his wife was linked to the birth of his latest child.

In the summer of 1604 Brueghel visited Prague. Prague was the location of the court of Rudolf II, Holy Roman Emperor who promoted artistic innovation. The Emperor's court had attracted many Northern artists such as Bartholomeus Spranger and Hans von Aachen who created a new affected style, full of conceits, which became known as Mannerism.

Upon returning to Antwerp in September 1604 Brueghel bought a large house called "De Meerminne" (The Mermaid) in the Lange Nieuwstraat in Antwerp on 20 September 1604. The artist remarried in April 1605. With his second wife Catharina van Mariënburg he had 8 children of whom Ambrosius became a painter.

After his appointment as court painter of the Archduke and Duchess Albrecht and Isabella in 1606, the artist was present in Brussels for periods in the years 1606, 1609, 1610 and 1613. On 28 August 1613 the court in Brussels paid Brueghel 3625 guilders for completing various works.

From October 1610 onwards Rubens started taking on the role of intermediary for his friend Jan Brueghel. By the year 1625 Rubens had written about 25 letters to Cardinal Borromeo on behalf of Brueghel. In a letter to Borromeo Brueghel referred to his friend's role as that of "mio secretario Rubens" (my secretary Rubens). In the year 1612 or 1613 Peter Paul Rubens painted a portrait of Jan Brueghel and his family (Courtauld Institute, London). In 1613 he accompanied Rubens and Hendrick van Balen the Elder on a diplomatic mission to the Dutch Republic. Here they met Hendrick Goltzius and other Haarlem artists.

When Duke Johan Ernest van Saksen passed through Antwerp in 1614 he took time to pay a visit to Rubens and Brueghel in their workshops. Brueghel received many official commissions from the Antwerp city magistrate. Four of his paintings were offered by the Antwerp city magistrate to the Archduke and Duchess Albrecht and Isabella on 27 August 1615. He was in 1618 one of 12 important painters from Antwerp who were commissioned by the Antwerp city magistrate to produce a series of paintings for the Archduke and Duchess Albrecht and Isabella. For this commission, Brueghel coordinated the work on a painting cycle depicting an Allegory of the Five Senses. The artists participating in the project included Rubens, Frans Snyders, Frans Francken the Younger, Joos de Momper, Hendrick van Balen the Elder and Sebastiaen Vrancx. The works were destroyed in a fire in 1713.

On 9 March 1619 Brueghel bought a third house called Den Bock (the Billy Goat) located in the Antwerp Arenbergstraat. When on 6 August 1623 his daughter Clara Eugenia was baptized, Archduchess Isabella and Cardinal Borromeo were her godparents. Jan Brueghel died on 13 January 1625 in Antwerp from complications arising from cholera.

The artist's estate was distributed on 3 June and 23 June 1627 among his surviving wife and his children from both marriages. Rubens, Hendrick van Balen the Elder, Cornelis Schut and Paulus van Halmaele were the executors of his last will. Rubens was the guardian of the surviving Brueghel children.

His students included his son Jan as well as Daniel Seghers. Brueghel's daughter Paschasia married the painter Hieronymus van Kessel the Younger, and their son Jan van Kessel the Elder studied with Jan Brueghel the Younger. Brueghel's daughter Anna married David Teniers the Younger in 1637.

Work

General

Jan Brueghel the Elder was a versatile artist who practised in many genres and introduced various new subjects into Flemish art. He was an innovator who contributed to the development of the various genres to which he put his hand such as flower still lifes, landscapes and seascapes, hunting pieces, battle scenes and scenes of hellfire and the underworld. His best-known innovations are the new types of paintings, which he introduced into the repertoire of Flemish art in the first quarter of the 17th century such as flower garland paintings, paradise landscapes and gallery paintings. Unlike contemporary Flemish Baroque artists, such as Rubens, he did not produce large altarpieces for the local churches.

Jan Brueghel the Elder achieved a superb technical mastery, which enabled him to render materials, animals and landscapes with remarkable accuracy and a high degree of finish. He had an accomplished miniaturist technique allowing him to achieve an accurate description of nature.

Little is known about the workshop practices of Brueghel. He operated a large workshop that allowed him to produce a large quantity of works, which were in turn reproduced in his workshop. After Brueghel's death in 1625, Jan Brueghel the Younger took charge of his father's workshop which he operated in the same way as his father. This is clear in the style of the surviving paintings which are in the vein of his father's and the continued collaboration with former collaborators of his father such as Rubens and Hendrick van Balen. This workshop production contributed to the wide distribution of Jan Brueghel the Elder's creations.

While his brother Pieter was engaged in the large-scale production of numerous works for the Antwerp art market, Jan Brueghel worked for a select clientele of aristocratic patrons and collectors of pictures to create more expensive and exclusive images. His works, such as his paradise landscapes, appealed to the aesthetic preferences of aristocrats who loved collecting such precious objects. His works, often painted on copper, were luxury objects intended for the simple pleasure of viewing as well as contemplation.

Collaborations

Collaboration between artists specialized in distinctive genres was a defining feature of artistic practice in 17th century Antwerp. Jan Brueghel was likewise a frequent collaborator with fellow artists. As he was an artist with a wide range of skills he worked with a number of collaborators in various genres. His collaborators included landscape artists Paul Bril and Joos de Momper, architectural painter Paul Vredeman de Vries and figure painters Frans Francken the Younger, Hendrick de Clerck, Pieter van Avont and Hendrick van Balen.

His collaborations with figure painter Hans Rottenhammer began in Rome around 1595 and ended in 1610. Rottenhammer was a gifted figure painter and known for his skill in painting nudes. Initially when the artists both lived in Venice, their collaborative works were executed on canvas, but in their later collaborations after Brueghel had returned to Antwerp they typically used copper. After Brueghel's return to Antwerp, their collaboration practice was for Brueghel to send the coppers with the landscape to Rottenhammer in Venice, who painted in the figures and then returned the coppers. In a few instances, the process was the other way around. Brueghel and Rottenhammer did not only collaborate on landscape paintings with figures. The artists jointly created one of the earliest devotional garland paintings, made for Cardinal Federico Borromeo, depicting a Virgin and Child surrounded by a flower garland (Pinacoteca Ambrosiana).

While in his collaborations with Hans Rottenhammer, the landscapes were made by Brueghel, the roles were reversed when he worked with Joos de Momper as it was Brueghel who provided the figures to the landscapes painted by de Momper. An example of their collaboration is Mountain Landscape with Pilgrims in a Grotto Chapel (c. 1616, Liechtenstein Museum). There are about 59 known collaborations between Brueghel and de Momper making de Momper his most frequent collaborator. Hendrick van Balen the Elder was another regular collaborator with Jan Brueghel. Their collaboration was simplified by the fact that from 1604 onwards both painters had moved to the Lange Nieuwstraat, which made it easier to carry the panels and copper plates on which they collaborated back and forth.

Another frequent collaborator of Jan Brueghel was Rubens. The two artists executed about 25 joint works in the period from 1598 to 1625. Their first collaboration was on The Battle of the Amazons (c. 1598-1600, Sanssouci Picture Gallery). The artists worked together in the development of the genre of the devotional garland painting with works such as the Madonna in a Floral Wreath (c. 1616-1618, Alte Pinakothek). They further jointly made mythological scenes and an allegorical series representing the Five Senses. The collaboration between the two friends was remarkable because they worked in very different styles and specializations and were artists of equal status. They were able to preserve the individuality of their respective styles in these joint works.

Brueghel appears to have been the principal initiator of their joint works, which were made principally during the second half of the 1610s when their method of collaboration had become more systemised and included Rubens' workshop. Usually it would be Brueghel who started a painting and he would leave space for Rubens to add the figures. In their early collaborations they seem to have made major corrections to the work of the other. For instance, in the early collaborative effort The Return from War: Mars Disarmed by Venus Rubens overpainted most of the lower-right corner with gray paint so he could enlarge his figures. In later collaborations the artists seem to have streamlined their collaboration and agreed on the composition early on so that these later works show little underdrawing. As court painters to the archdukes their collaborations reflected the court's desire to emphasise the continuity of its reign with the previous Burgundian and Habsburg rulers as well as the rulers' piousness. While they were mindful of the prevailing tastes in courtly circles, which favoured themes such as the hunt, the two artists were creative in their response to the court's preferences by devising new iconography and genres, such as the devotional garland paintings, which were equally capable of conveying the devoutness and splendor of the archducal court. The joint artistic output of Brueghel and Rubens was highly prized by collectors all over Europe.

Ideological context

Jan Brueghel's work reflects the various ideological currents at work in the Catholic Spanish Netherlands during his lifetime. The Catholic Counter-Reformation's worldview played an important role in the artist's practice. Central in this worldview was the belief that the earth and its inhabitants were revelations of God. Artistic representation of, and scientific investigation into, that divine revelation was encouraged and valued. Breughel's friend and patron, the Counter-Reformation Cardinal Federico Borromeo, particularly emphasized the beauty and diversity of the animal world. In his I tre libri delle laudi divine (published only posthumously in 1632) Borromeo wrote: 'Looking then with attentive study at animals' construction and formation, and at their parts, members, and characters, can it not be said how excellently divine wisdom has demonstrated the value of its great works?' Jan Brueghel's realistic depictions of nature in all its various forms, in flowers, landscapes, animals, etc., was clearly in line with the view that study of the god's creation was an important source for knowing this god.

Brueghel's era also saw a growing interest in the study of nature through empirical evidence as opposed to relying on inherited tradition. The increased access to new animals and exotic plants from the newly discovered territories played an important role in this intellectual exploration. This resulted in the appearance of the first scholarly catalogues and encyclopedias, including the illustrated natural history catalogues of 16th-century naturalists Conrad Gesner and Ulisse Aldrovandi. Their major contribution to natural history was the creation of an extensive system of description of each animal. Gesner placed all the species within four general categories: quadrupeds, birds, fish and serpents. He described animals in alphabetical order and in terms of nomenclature, geographic origins, mode of living and behavior. Aldrovandi took another approach and did not order animals alphabetically. He relied on visual resemblance as the classifying factor. For example, he grouped the horse together with analogous animals, such as the donkey and mule, and separated species into categories, such as birds with webbed feet and nocturnal birds.

Brueghel's works reflect this contemporary encyclopedic interest in the classification and ordering of all of the natural world. This is evidenced in his flower pieces, landscapes, allegorical works and gallery paintings. In his paradise landscapes, for instance, Brueghel grouped most of the species according to their basic categories of biological classification, in other words, according to the main groups of related species that resemble one another, such as birds or quadrupeds. He further classified most of them into subdivisions consisting of similar morphological and behavioral characteristics. His paradise landscapes thus constituted a visual catalogue of animals and birds which fulfilled the role of micro-encyclopedia.

Brueghel's endeavor to represent the world through ordering and classifying its many elements based on empirical observation did not stop with the natural world. In Prague he had acquired knowledge of the large collections of Emperor Rudolf II, which were divided in natural, artificial and scientific objects. Brueghel's allegorical paintings of the four elements and of the five senses reveal the same classifying obsession, using each element or sense to organize natural, man-made instruments and scientific objects. In this skillful union of the areas of art, science, and nature Brueghel demonstrates his mastery of these various disciplines. His paintings serve the same purpose to that of encyclopedic collections by linking between the mundus sensibilis and the mundus intelligibilis. His approach to describing and cataloguing nature in art resembles the distinction natural historians were starting to make between perceptual experience and theoretical knowledge.

Brueghel's obsession with classifying the world was completely in line with the encyclopedic tastes of the court in Brussels as is demonstrated by their large art collection of predominantly Flemish paintings, menagerie of exotic species and extensive library.

Flower paintings
Jan Brueghel the Elder was one of the first artists in the Habsburg Netherlands who started to paint pure flower still lifes. A pure flower still life depicts flowers, typically arranged in a vase or other vessel, as the principal subject of the picture, rather than as a subordinate part of another work such as a history painting. Jan Brueghel is regarded as an important contributor to the emerging genre of the flower piece in Northern art, a contribution that was already appreciated in his time when he received the nickname 'Flower Brueghel'. While the traditional interpretation of these flower pieces was that they were vanitas symbols or allegories of transience with hidden meanings, it is now more common to interpret them as mere depictions of the natural world. 

The Flemish engraver Pieter van der Borcht introduced the singerie as an independent theme around 1575 in a series of prints, which were strongly embedded in the artistic tradition of Pieter Bruegel the Elder. These prints were widely disseminated and the theme was then picked up by other Flemish artists. The first one to do so was the Antwerp artist Frans Francken the Younger, who was quickly followed by Jan Brueghel the Elder, the Younger, Sebastiaen Vrancx and Jan van Kessel the Elder. Jan Brueghel the Elder's son-in-law David Teniers the Younger became the principal practitioner of the genre and developed it further with his younger brother Abraham Teniers. Later in the 17th century Nicolaes van Verendael started to paint these 'monkey scenes' as well.

An example of a singerie by Jan Brueghel is the Monkeys feasting, which dates from his early years as an artist (private collection, on long-term loan to the Rubenshuis, Antwerp). This painting on copper was probably one of the first examples of a singerie painting. Jan Brueghel likely drew his monkeys in the zoo of the Archdukes in Brussels. While the composition shows the monkeys engaged in all kinds of mischief, it includes a painting above the door jamb, which is a work from Rubens' studio, called "Ceres and Pan". The representation of Ceres and Pan provides a contrast been the cultivated versus the wild world of the monkeys below.

References

Sources
 Leopoldine van Hogendorp Prosperetti, 'Landscape and Philosophy in the Art of Jan Brueghel the Elder (1568-1625)', Ashgate Publishing, Ltd., 2009
 Arianne Faber Kolb, Jan Brueghel the Elder: The Entry of the Animals into Noah’s Ark, Getty Publications, 2005
 Larry Silver, Peasant Scenes and Landscapes: The Rise of Pictorial Genres in the Antwerp Art Market, University of Pennsylvania Press, 4 January 2012
 Anne T. Woollett and Ariane van Suchtelen; with contributions by Tiarna Doherty, Mark Leonard, and Jørgen Wadum, Rubens and Brueghel: A Working Friendship, 2006

External links

1568 births
1625 deaths
Flemish Baroque painters
Flemish genre painters
Flemish history painters
Flemish landscape painters
Flemish still life painters
Jan 1
Jan 01
Painters from Antwerp
Artists from Brussels
Artists from Antwerp
People of the Habsburg Netherlands
16th-century Flemish painters
17th-century Flemish painters